Carlos Heriberto Pinto Rosas (born August 7, 1985, in Culiacán, Sinaloa) is a Mexican former professional footballer who last played for Sinaloa of Liga MX.

External links
 

Living people
1985 births
Mexican footballers
Association football defenders
Alacranes de Durango footballers
Dorados de Sinaloa footballers
Querétaro F.C. footballers
C.D. Veracruz footballers
Irapuato F.C. footballers
Liga MX players
Ascenso MX players
Footballers from Sinaloa
Sportspeople from Culiacán